Ned L. McDonald (January 2, 1910 – February 8, 1977) was an American football coach.  He served as the head football coach at the University of Virginia from 1953 to 1955. He played college football at the University of Texas from 1937 to 1939 under head coach Dana X. Bible, captaining in 1939.

McDonald died of a heart attack in 1977.

Head coaching record

References

1910 births
1977 deaths
Texas Longhorns football players
Virginia Cavaliers football coaches
People from Caldwell, Texas